Williamsburg, California may refer to:
 Kernville (former town), California
 Old Town, Kern County, California